The 1962 United States Grand Prix was a Formula One motor race held on October 7, 1962, at the Watkins Glen Grand Prix Race Course in Watkins Glen, New York. It was race 8 of 9 in both the 1962 World Championship of Drivers and the 1962 International Cup for Formula One Manufacturers. The 100-lap race was won by Lotus driver Jim Clark after starting from pole position. Graham Hill finished second for the BRM team and Cooper driver Bruce McLaren came in third.

Summary
New Lotus star Jim Clark of Scotland took his third victory of the season, and the third of his career, to keep alive his hopes of catching Graham Hill for the 1962 World Driver's Championship with one race remaining. Hill finished nine seconds back in second place for BRM, while Bruce McLaren was third, despite being a lap down.

For the third consecutive year, Ferrari had decided not to make the trip across the Atlantic for the American race. It had been a miserable year for the team, finishing sixth in the eight-team Constructor's Championship (without a victory), after winning it the year before. The powerful new V8 engines built by Climax and BRM for the second year of the 1.5-liter formula had taken the series by storm, and Ferrari's advantage from  had been completely erased.Also, as a result, American Phil Hill was again without a drive in his home country, and, worse yet, he learned from a reliable source at The Glen that he had been fired.

In Friday's qualifying session, Graham Hill, Hill's BRM teammate Richie Ginther, Clark and Jack Brabham (using his own BT3 model for just the second time) all bettered the previous year's lap record of 1:18.2. Clark then went out and shattered the absolute course record, set under the 2.5-liter formula by Stirling Moss, with a staggering 1:15.8. Damp and misty conditions on Saturday prohibited anyone improving their Friday time, so the top six were Clark in the Lotus, Ginther and Hill's BRM's, American Dan Gurney in a Porsche, Brabham, and McLaren's Cooper.

By race time on Sunday, there were 40,000 fans braving the cold winds and a threat of rain. At the start, Clark led off the grid, while Hill jumped into second behind him. With Ginther, Brabham, Gurney and McLaren following, the two Championship rivals pulled away, already lowering the F1 track record on lap 3. Gurney got by Brabham and Ginther and briefly took third place, but on lap 11, Ginther retook the spot behind his teammate when Gurney slid half off the track, inches from the Armco, on a patch of oil in the Loop.

On lap 12, the two leaders were already coming up to lap the tail-enders. When Clark was delayed in the traffic, Hill took the lead away from him. By lap 19, however, Clark had lowered the lap record to 1:15.4, well under his qualifying time, and retaken the lead for good. Ginther was struggling with a deteriorating gearbox and began to fall back until a missed shift on lap 35 blew the engine and ended a fine run.

As Clark continued comfortably ahead of Hill, McLaren was now hounding Gurney for third place. The New Zealander's Cooper slid by on lap 57, and soon after, Gurney began losing power in the Porsche's engine. Brabham closed the gap between them, and when he grabbed fourth place from the American on lap 69, he claimed the first Championship points ever scored by the Brabham make.

Clark and Hill were the only cars on the lead lap toward the end as both lapped repeatedly under their grid times. Clark eventually clocked a 1:15.0 on lap 70 for the fastest lap of the race, and eased off from his biggest lead of 17 seconds to take the second consecutive American Grand Prix win for Team Lotus. "I planned to get in front and stay there," Clark said. "I set up the car for dry weather just before we started. I sure am glad the weather held up!" Indeed, moments after the Scot had taken the checkered flag, a drizzle began to fall.

Classification
 Qualifying 

Race

 Scuderia Ferrari were entered for the race as #1, 2 and 3, but nominated neither cars nor drivers.
 #7 was allocated to Rob Walker Racing Team, but this entry was not fulfilled either.

Championship standings after the race

Drivers' Championship standings

Constructors' Championship standings

 Notes: Only the top five positions are included for both sets of standings. Only the best 5 results counted towards the Championship. Numbers without parentheses are Championship points; numbers in parentheses are total points scored.

References

Further reading
 Doug Nye (1978). The United States Grand Prix and Grand Prize Races, 1908-1977. B. T. Batsford. 
 James T. Crow (January, 1963). "Grand Prix of the U.S.". Road & Track'', 62-66.
 "The Formula One Record Book", John Thompson, 1974.

United States Grand Prix
United States Grand Prix
United States Grand Prix
United States Grand Prix
United States Grand Prix